Svalikhita-jivani is an autobiography written in 1896 by Kedarnatha Datta (also known as Bhaktivinoda Thakur), a prominent thinker of Bengali Renaissance and a leading philosopher, savant and  spiritual reformer of Gaudiya Vaishnavism who effected its resurgence in India in late 19th and early 20th century and was hailed by contemporary scholars as the most influential Gaudiya Vaisnava leader of his time.

Written in Bengali on the request of Bhaktivinoda's son Lalita Prasad, Svalikhita-jivani gives a detailed autobiographical account that spanned most of his life from his birth in 1838 until retirement in 1894. The book was published by Lalita Prasad in 1916, after Bhaktivinoda's death.

Summary

On the request of his son Lalita Prasad, in 1896 Bhaktivinoda wrote a detailed autobiography called Svalikhita-jivani that covered 56 years of his life from birth up until that time. Recounting his life's episodes with candour, Bhaktivinoda portrayed his path as full of financial struggle, health issues, internal doubts and insecurity, and deep introspection that gradually led him, sometimes in convoluted ways, to the deliberate and mature decision of accepting Caitanya Mahaprabhu and his teachings as his final goal. Bhaktivinoda did not display much concern for how this candid account would reflect on his status as an established Gaudiya Vaisnava spiritual leader with a large following, in the eyes of thousands of his intellectual bhadralok disciples. It is telling that Bhaktivinoda never refers to himself as feeling or displaying any special spiritual acumen, saintlihood, powers, or charisma – anything worthy of veneration. Rather, the honest, almost self-deprecating narrative portrays him as a genuine, exceptionally humble and modest man. The book was published by Lalita Prasad in 1916 after Bhaktivinoda's passing.

See also
 Bhaktivinoda Thakur bibliography

Footnotes

References

 
 
 
 

Autobiographies
Indian literature
Bengali-language literature